Tracy Higgs (also known as T.J. Higgs) (born 1970) describes herself as a psychic medium and appears regularly in the media in the United Kingdom.  She writes for Spirit and Destiny magazine, and has appeared on the Richard & Judy television programme.

In 2006 Higgs filmed a series for Zone Reality, with Tony Stockwell and Colin Fry called Psychic Private Eyes.

References

Bibliography

External links

Psychic Private Eyes Zone Reality TV

1970 births
Living people
British television personalities
British psychics